Shek Kip Mei is a station on the Hong Kong MTR . It is located in Shek Kip Mei.

History
The very first train departed from this station on 1 October 1979.

Station layout

Entrances and exits
A: Nam Cheong Street
B1: Woh Chai Street
B2: Woh Chai Street
C: Wai Chi Street

Gallery

References

MTR stations in Kowloon
Kwun Tong line
Shek Kip Mei
Railway stations in Hong Kong opened in 1979